Eric Francis Coppolino (born 1964) is an American investigative reporter who specializes in corporate fraud and toxic torts litigation, and also the former astrologer for the New York Daily News and Marie Claire magazine.

In 2005, while based in Paris, he created Book of Blue, a fine art photo studio and series of online books.

Early life
Eric Francis was born in Brooklyn, New York to Joseph Coppolino, a professor of communications, and Camille Cacciatore, a language teacher. At John Dewey High School, he was editor in chief of Gadfly, the official social science journal.

Journalist
Eric Francis' first journalism job was as a staff reporter for the Echoes-Sentinel in Warren Township, New Jersey. This was a straightforward municipal reporting assignment (covering the Township Committee, the Planning Board and related functions).

He was a reporter/editor at Whitaker Newsletters, Inc., assigned to Health Professions Report, where he covered the American Medical Association, the American Nurses' Association and other medical industry issues, at the height of the nursing shortage in the late 1980s.

In 1984 Francis founded Generation, a weekly student magazine at the University at Buffalo.

He then moved into investigative journalism, in 1989 founding New York State Student Leader, later the Student Leader News Service (SLNS), in New Paltz, New York. SLNS covered higher education for the State and City University systems in New York; it chronicled the chronic budget cuts and tuition increases of the time, and was the first dependable student news entity covering the State University Board of Trustees and the New York State Legislature. The New York Times described Francis as one of the few people not on the state payroll who understood the state budget. Beginning in the late 1990s, he also wrote a column for Chronogram magazine.

Coverage of PCBs and dioxins
As editor of SLNS, he covered the SUNY New Paltz PCB disaster of December 29, 1991, in which a transformer accident contaminated several dormitories with PCBs and dioxin, one of few reporters to do so after the first month of what became a decade-plus cleanup that cost state taxpayers $50 million by 1997. His investigative articles on the issue have been published in Sierra, the magazine of the Sierra Club, the Village Voice, Woodstock Times, the Las Vegas Sun, The St. Louis Journalism Review, Lies of Our Times, and other national and international publications.

His persistent coverage led to his being banned from the New Paltz campus as an alleged public nuisance on May 5, 1993. Challenging the ban, he brought a federal lawsuit against the State of New York in the persons of college president Dr. Alice Chandler and associate vice president for student affairs Dr. L. David Eaton, on freedom of speech and equal protection grounds (1st and 14th amendments), represented by civil rights attorney Alan Sussman. In summer 1994, the case was settled out of court, he was paid $20,000 damages, and the ban was rescinded with an acknowledgement from the state that his civil rights "may have been violated".

Astrology
Francis formerly wrote astrology columns in the New York Daily News, Marie Claire magazine, and Chronogram.  He continues to publish horoscopes alongside several other astrology writers such as Amanda Painter, Amy Elliot, and Len Wallick on his website called Planet Waves.

In 2018, after an internal investigation involving multiple #MeToo allegations, Chronogram severed ties with Francis. The astrologer was let go from his positions at the Omega Institute for Holistic Studies and Radio Kingston in the same time period.

References 

20th-century astrologers
21st-century astrologers
1964 births
Living people
American astrologers
American male journalists
American photographers
People from Brooklyn
John Dewey High School alumni
Journalists from New York City
Fourth-wave feminism
2018 controversies in the United States
2018 scandals
Entertainment scandals
Sexual harassment in the United States
July 2018 events in the United States
University at Buffalo alumni